Harold "Bunny" Louis Abbott (17 June 1882 – 16 January 1971) was a New Zealand rugby union footballer. He was a member of the legendary 1905 Original All Blacks, and played 11 matches for the team, scoring 47 points. He won his sole Test cap for New Zealand on 1 January 1906 against France. He also made one appearance as a guest player for British Columbia against the All Blacks, when the former team were short of players.

He was the uncle of New Zealand rugby league international Edwin Abbott.

Abbott died in Palmerston North in 1971 and was buried in Kelvin Grove Cemetery.

References

1882 births
1971 deaths
Burials at Kelvin Grove Cemetery
Farriers
New Zealand international rugby union players
New Zealand rugby union players
Rugby union players from Waikato
Rugby union wings
Taranaki rugby union players
Wanganui rugby union players